"She Knows" is a hip hop song performed by American recording artist Ne-Yo, taken from his sixth studio album, Non-Fiction (2015). It features a guest verse by rapper Juicy J. The song was released on September 16, 2014 by Compound Entertainment and Motown Records, and serves as the lead single from the album following the release of an R&B-tinged first single, "Money Can't Buy". The song was produced by Dr. Luke and Cirkut, with vocal production by Jesse "Corparal" Wilson.

Critical reception
AllMusic's Andy Kellman put it alongside 'She Said I'm Hood Tho' and 'One More' as being "all tough but finely crafted slow jams." Justin Charity of Complex described the song as "the rare, contemporary hit, with obvious appeal to Juicy J and to the rest of us as a clean, big beat swing at urban radio play."

Remixes
The official remix, the "R&B Remix" features Trey Songz, The-Dream and T-Pain. Another official remix, released on February 20, 2015, features Fabolous, French Montana and the original guest Juicy J. The song features vocals from the infamous Crack Kid on Vine. The album remix features a second verse from Juicy J in the beginning of the song.

Music video
A music video was uploaded on YouTube, October 8, 2014. Everywhere Ne-Yo goes, from the grocery store to the library to the office, he sees pole dancing girls. The video is directed by Emil Nava.

Track listing
Digital download
"She Knows" (featuring Juicy J) – 3:41

Charts

Weekly charts

Year-end charts

Certifications

Release history

References

2014 singles
2014 songs
Ne-Yo songs
Juicy J songs
Songs written by Ne-Yo
Songs written by Dr. Luke
Songs written by Juicy J
Songs written by Cirkut (record producer)